At the 1952 Winter Olympics in Oslo, six Nordic skiing events were contested – four cross-country skiing events, one ski jumping event, and one Nordic combined event.

Medal table

References

1952 Winter Olympics events
1952
Holmenkollen
Nordic skiing competitions in Norway